New Post 69A is a First Nations reserve in Cochrane District, Ontario. It is one of two reserves for the Taykwa Tagamou Nation.

References

Cree reserves in Ontario
Communities in Cochrane District